The 1873 Lisburn by-election was held on 19 February 1873.  The election was held due to the resignation in order to contest County Armagh of the incumbent Conservative MP, Edward Wingfield Verner.  It was won by the unopposed Conservative candidate Sir Richard Wallace.

References

1873 elections in the United Kingdom
19th century in County Antrim
Politics of Lisburn
By-elections to the Parliament of the United Kingdom in County Antrim constituencies
Unopposed by-elections to the Parliament of the United Kingdom (need citation)
1873 elections in Ireland